The 2022 UEC European Track Championships (under-23 & junior) were the 22nd continental championships for European under-23 and junior track cyclists, and the 13th since the event was renamed following the reorganisation of European track cycling in 2010. The event took place at the Velódromo Nacional Sangalhos in Anadia, Portugal from 14 to 19 July 2022.

Medal summary

Under-23

Junior

Medal table

References

External links
European Cycling Union
Results
Results book

under-23
European Track Championships, 2022
European Track
International cycle races hosted by Portugal
UEC